Ulomyia is a genus of flies belonging to the family Psychodidae.

Distribution
The species of this genus are found in Eurasia and Northern America.

Species
Ulomyia annulata (Tonnoir, 1919)
Ulomyia asiaminorica Wagner, 2013
Ulomyia basaltica Vaillant, 1983
Ulomyia bulgarica Wagner & Joost, 1988
Ulomyia canisquamata (Tokunaga, 1961)
Ulomyia cognata (Eaton, 1893)
Ulomyia expetenda Wagner, 1978
Ulomyia fuliginosa (Meigen, 1804)
Ulomyia hispanica (Sarà, 1954)
Ulomyia ibirica Wagner, Andrade & Gonsalves, 2022
Ulomyia incurva Feuerborn, 1922
Ulomyia itoi (Tokunaga, 1961)
Ulomyia kaszabi Vaillant, 1973
Ulomyia mirabilis (Sarà, 1952)
Ulomyia montanoi Salamanna & Raggio, 1985
Ulomyia montium Vaillant, 1983
Ulomyia ophicornis Vaillant, 1983
Ulomyia rostrata Vaillant, 1983
Ulomyia scurina (Vaillant, 1958)
Ulomyia spinifera Krek, 1990
Ulomyia spinosa Krek, 1972
Ulomyia szaboi Vaillant, 1983
Ulomyia umbripennis Vaillant, 1983
Ulomyia undulata (Tonnoir, 1919)
Ulomyia vaseki Ježek, 2002
Ulomyia yanoi (Tokunaga & Komyo, 1955)

References

Psychodomorpha genera
Diptera of Asia
Diptera of Europe
Diptera of North America
Diptera of South America
Psychodidae